Scheimpflug may refer to:

Scheimpflug principle
Lotte Scheimpflug, luger
Theodor Scheimpflug, Austrian photographer